Evanne Ní Chuilinn (born 5 September 1981) is an Irish sports journalist and television presenter. She currently works as a sports news presenter on RTÉ News: Six One.

Ní Chuilinn has graduated from NUI Galway.

Ní Chuilinn began her career as a sub editor with RTÉ Sport in 2004 where she worked behind the scenes on various sports programmes. She progressed onto RTÉ Radio 1 and RTÉ 2fm where she delivered the hourly sports bulletins, as well as co-presenting various live Gaelic games broadcasts.  A move to television in 2006 saw Ní Chuilinn work as a reporter on minority sports programme, OB Sport. She became the sideline reporter for the Sunday Game in 2007.

In 2008 Ní Chuilinn started working for RTÉ News, initially as a sports reporter, and shortly afterwards as a sports news presenter on RTÉ News: Six One. Since then she has covered several major sporting events, including the Olympic Games.

References

1981 births
Living people
Alumni of the University of Galway
People from Kilkenny (city)
RTÉ newsreaders and journalists
Irish women journalists
Irish women radio presenters